The 2016 Ulster Senior Football Championship was the 128th instalment of the annual Ulster Senior Football Championship held under the auspices of the Ulster GAA. It is one of the four provincial competitions of the 2016 All-Ireland Senior Football Championship. The competition ran from to 15 May to 17 July 2016.

The draw for the Championship was made on 16 October 2015. As in the previous two seasons, the two sides were named as A and B, to allow for teams to more easily predict the dates of their qualifier matches. Armagh, Cavan, Derry, and Tyrone were named to the A side, with Antrim, Donegal, Down, Fermanagh and Monaghan on the B side.

Monaghan were the defending champions following their victory over Donegal in the final of the 2015 Championship.

Tyrone beat Donegal 0-13 to 0-11 in the 2016 final.

Teams
The Ulster championship is contested by the nine county teams in the province of Ulster.

Bracket

Preliminary round

Quarter-finals

Semi-finals

Final

See also
 Fixtures and results
 2016 All-Ireland Senior Football Championship
 2016 Connacht Senior Football Championship
 2016 Leinster Senior Football Championship
 2016 Munster Senior Football Championship

References

2U
2016 in Northern Ireland sport
Ulster Senior Football Championship